Jean-Luc Parodi (8 June 1937 – 21 January 2022) was a French political scientist.

Biography
Jean-Luc was the son of Alexandre Parodi, a Councillor of State and a member of the French Resistance. His uncle, René Parodi, was made a Companion of the Liberation posthumously, following his death in 1942.

He also wrote a thesis on the political system of the French Fifth Republic under the direction of René Rémond. He earned a doctorate in political science in 1974.

He was also heavily involved with the Institut français d'opinion publique, where he was a pioneer in the analysis of political polls. He was the first person to predict a presidential election in France in 1965 and the first to analyze municipal elections in 1983.

He was an Officer of the National Order of the Legion of Honour.

He died in Paris on 21 January 2022, at the age of 84.

Publications
La Vie économique et sociale de la nation (1969)
La Constitution de la Cinquième République (1985)
L'Hérédité en politique (1992)
L'Écriture de la Constitution de 1958 (1992)

References

1937 births
2022 deaths
People from Paris
French people of Italian descent
French political scientists
Sciences Po alumni
Officiers of the Légion d'honneur